William Wallace Leard (October 14, 1885 in Oneida, New York – January 15, 1970 in San Francisco, California), nicknamed "Wild Bill", was a former professional baseball player who played second base in three games for the 1917 Brooklyn Robins.

He was later a minor league manager from 1917 to 1927.

External links

1885 births
1970 deaths
Amsterdam-Gloversville-Johnstown Jags players
Baseball players from New York (state)
Beaumont Oilers players
Brooklyn Robins players
Charleston Pals players
Chattanooga Lookouts players
Chicago Cubs scouts
Dallas Marines players
Danville Tobacconists players
Elmira Colonels players
Gloversville-Johnstown Jags players
Hudson Marines players
Macon Peaches players
Major League Baseball second basemen
Minor league baseball managers
Mission Bells players
Oakland Oaks (baseball) players
People from Oneida, New York
San Francisco Seals (baseball) players
Seattle Giants players
Seattle Rainiers players
Sioux City Packers players
Tacoma Tigers players
Venice Tigers players
Victoria Islanders players
Waterloo Boosters players
Wilkes-Barre Barons (baseball) players